Lithuania competed at the 2002 Winter Olympics in Salt Lake City, United States.

Biathlon

Men

Women

Cross-country skiing

Figure skating

Ice Dancing

References
Official Olympic Reports

Nations at the 2002 Winter Olympics
2002 Winter Olympics
Winter Olympics